Roberto Bellarosa (born 23 August 1994) is a Belgian singer. Bellarosa came to fame for being the first winner of The Voice Belgique. He also represented Belgium in the Eurovision Song Contest 2013. He finished in 12th place with 71 points.

Biography
He was born in Wanze into a family of footballers of Italian origin from Vico del Gargano, in the southern region of Apulia. At the age of nine Bellarosa was enrolled by his parents at a school of music in Huy. During choral classes, his teacher was impressed by his voice, and his parents encouraged the young Bellarosa to take extra singing lessons.

Career

2011–12: The Voice Belgique
In 2011, Bellarosa took part in the Walloon version of The Voice (The Voice Belgique), created by John de Mol.

After applying online, Bellarosa attended the blind auditions, where he sang "You Give Me Something" by James Morrison. With Quentin Mosimann, Lio, Joshua and Beverly Jo Scott, all turning their chairs to face him, Bellarosa ultimately decided to join Quentin Mosimann's team with assistant coach Tara McDonald.

On 10 April 2012, after 16 weeks of competition, Bellarosa was voted the winner gaining 57% of the votes from the public, receiving a contract with Sony Music, which he recorded an album along with two singles.

List of songs performed on The Voice Belgique

2012–13: Ma voie and Eurovision Song Contest
In 2012, Bellarosa participated in The Voice Belgique live tour along with 11 of the other contestants throughout Belgium. On 6 July 2012, Bellarosa released his first single "Je Crois", working with his The Voice Belgique coach, Quentin Mosimann and assistant coach Tara McDonald. His first album Ma voie was released on 21 September 2012, and his second single "Apprends-moi" was released on 26 October 2012.

On 16 November 2012, it was announced by Radio Télévision Belge Francophone (RTBF), that Bellarosa would represent Belgium at the Eurovision Song Contest 2013, to be held in Malmö, Sweden, with the song Love Kills. He made it into the final and finished at the 12th place.

Discography

Albums

Singles

Other charted songs

Notes

References

External links
Roberto Bellarosa on The Voice Belgique

1994 births
Living people
People from Wanze
Belgian people of Italian descent
21st-century Belgian male singers
21st-century Belgian singers
Eurovision Song Contest entrants for Belgium
Belgian pop singers
Eurovision Song Contest entrants of 2013
Belgian child singers
The Voice (franchise) winners
Walloon musicians